This is the discography (albums, EPs, singles, and remixes) released by Amon Tobin under his own name, under the names Cujo, Two Fingers and Only Child Tyrant, and in collaboration with other artists.

As Amon Tobin

Albums
Adventures in Foam (Ninebar, 1996) (as Cujo) (Re-issue, Ninja Tune, 2002)
Bricolage (Ninja Tune, 1997)
Permutation (Ninja Tune, 1998)
Supermodified (Ninja Tune, 2000)
Out from Out Where (Ninja Tune, 2002) - Chart positions: Heatseekers: 43, Top Independent Albums: 32
Chaos Theory - Splinter Cell 3 Soundtrack (Ninja Tune, 2005)
Foley Room (Ninja Tune, 2007) - Chart positions: Top Electronic Albums: 13
ISAM (Ninja Tune, 2011)
Fear in a Handful of Dust (Nomark Records, 2019)
Time To Run (Nomark Records, 2019) (as Only Child Tyrant)
Long Stories (Nomark Records, 2019)
The World As We Know It (Nomark Records, 2020) (as Figueroa)
West Coast Love Stories (Nomark Records, 2021) (as Stone Giants)
How Do You Live (Nomark Records, 2021)

Collections, Collaborations & Other Appearances
 Verbal Remixes & Collaborations (Ninja Tune 2003)
 Kitchen Sink Remixes (2007)
 Peeping Tom (Ipecac, 2006) - An album by Mike Patton. Amon Tobin is featured on the track "Don't Even Trip".
 "Fine Objects" (Ancestor, 2010) - Single by ESKAMON (Amon Tobin & Eskmo)
 inFAMOUS: Original Soundtrack from the Video Game (Sony Computer Entertainment, 2009). In collaboration with Jim Dooley, Mel Wesson, JD Mayer, Martin Tillman, & Working for a Nuclear Free City.
 Splinter Cell: Conviction (2010) - Additional music produced for the video game, in collaboration with Michael Nielson & Kaveh Cohen.
 Monthly Joints Series (2010)
 Chaos Theory Remixed - Splinter Cell 3D Soundtrack (Ninja Tune, 2011)
 Boxset (Ninja Tune, 2012)
 "Small Time Shaded" (2020) (Nomark Club exclusive) - In collaboration with Patrick Watson
 Ghostcards (2020) - In collaboration with Thys

Singles & EPs
Curfew (1995) (as Cujo)
The Remixes (1996) (as Cujo)
Creatures (1996)
Chomp Samba (1997)
Mission (1997)
Piranha Breaks (1997)
Like Regular Chickens (Danny Breaks & Dillinja Remixes) (1998)
4 Ton Mantis (2000)
Slowly (2000)
East To West (2002)
Verbal (2002) - Chart positions: Canadian Singles Chart: 15
Angel Of Theft (2004) (as Player)
The Lighthouse (2005)
Bloodstone EP (2007)
Taxidermia EP (2008) (Digital Download Only)
 "Surge" (2011)
Dark Jovian EP (2015)
"On a Hilltop Sat the Moon" (2019)
"Vipers Follow You" (2019)
"Fooling Alright" (2019)
"Monkey Box" (2019) (as Only Child Tyrant)
"One Shy Morning" (2019)
"Full Panther" (2019)
Fine Strips of Violence (2019) (Nomark Club exclusive)
Nine Bars Back (2019) (as Cujo) (Nomark Club exclusive)
Neutrino Mass (2020) (Nomark Club exclusive)
"Future Things Swim Before Me" (2020) (Nomark Club exclusive)
"Slip One" (2020) (as Only Child Tyrant/Two Fingers)
End of Summer (2020)
"The Love Again" (2021) (as Only Child Tyrant)

B-Sides/Other Tracks 
Shiny Things (From Creatures)
Daytrip (From Creatures)
Tabukula Beach Resort (From Mission)
Piranha Breaks (From Piranha Breaks)
Sub Tropic (From Piranha Breaks)
Hot Pursuit (From Piranha Breaks)
 "Melody Infringement" (From Ninja Cuts: Funkungfusion compilation)
Yards (From 4 Ton Mantis)
 "Bad Sex" (feat. Chris Morris) (From Slowly)
 "Down & To The Left" (From Xen Cuts compilation)
East To West (From East To West)
Sirens (From East To West)
Cougar Merkin (From Verbal)
The Whole Nine (From Verbal)
El Chimi (From Verbal)
The Last Minute (From The Last Minute Soundtrack)
Here Comes The Moon Man (From Bloodstone)
Bad Girl (featuring Cecile (Under the alias 60 Hz)
Venus Hendrix Live Mix (Digital release - freebie)
Slayer Boot (Digital release - freebie)
Into the Dark Intermission (Digital release - freebie)
Overwhelming Forces (Digital release - freebie)
Machine Gun (Noisia Remix)

Live Releases
 Solid Steel Presents Amon Tobin: Recorded Live (Ninja Tune, 2004)
 Foley Room Recorded Live In Brussels (2008)(Self release from Amontobin.com)

Music videos
"4 Ton Mantis" (2000) - directed by Floria Sigismondi
"Slowly" (2000)
"Verbal" (2002) - directed by Alex Rutterford
"Proper Hoodidge" (2002) - directed by Corine Stübi
"El Cargo" (2005) - video by Hexstatic
"Esther's" (2010) - directed by Charles De Meyer
"Fooling Alright" (2019) - video by Christian Moeller
"Vipers will Follow" (2019) - directed by Charles De Meyer

As Two Fingers

Albums
 Two Fingers (Big Dada/Paper Bag Records, 2009). A new production collaboration between Amon Tobin and Doubleclick featuring MC Sway.
 Instrumentals (Big Dada/Paper Bag Records, 2009)
 Stunt Rhythms (Big Dada/Ninja Tunes, 2012)
 Six Rhythms EP (Division, 2015)
 Fight! Fight! Fight! (Nomark Records, 2020)

Singles
 "What You Know" (Feat. Sway) (Big Dada, 2009)
 "That Girl" (Feat. Sway) (Big Dada, 2009)
 "Bad Girl" (Big Dada, 2009) 
 "Sweden / Razorback" (Big Dada, 2012)
 "Vengence Rhythm" (Big Dada, 2012)
 "296 Rhythm" (2019)
 "You Ain't Down" (2019)
 "LED Moon Rhythm" (2019)
 "Fight! Fight! Fight!" (2020)

References

 Official Amon Tobin Website

External links
 Official Discography
 

Discographies of Brazilian artists
Pop music discographies